Kegley is an unincorporated community in Mercer County, West Virginia, United States. Kegley has a post office with ZIP code 24731.

References

Kegley History books and records in the Princeton public library

Unincorporated communities in Mercer County, West Virginia